Dominik Kozma (born 10 April 1991) is a Hungarian swimmer. He is the son of István Kozma, a professional footballer, who played for Dunfermline Athletic from 1989 to 1992.

Career

2008 Olympics 
Kozma made his Olympic debut in 2008, competing as part of the Hungarian men's 4 x 200 m freestyle team.

2012 Olympics 
At the 2012 Summer Olympics, he competed in the same event, and the 4 x 100 m medley relay as well as the individual 200 m freestyle.

2016 Olympics 
He competed in those three events, as well at the 100 m freestyle at the 2016 Olympics.

International Swimming League 
In 2019 Kozma was member of the 2019 International Swimming League representing Team Iron.

References

1991 births
Living people
Sportspeople from Dunfermline
Hungarian male swimmers
Swimmers at the 2008 Summer Olympics
Swimmers at the 2016 Summer Olympics
Hungarian male freestyle swimmers
Olympic swimmers of Hungary
Swimmers at the 2012 Summer Olympics
European Aquatics Championships medalists in swimming
World Aquatics Championships medalists in swimming
Swimmers at the 2020 Summer Olympics
20th-century Hungarian people